P'tit Quinquin (released as Li'l Quinquin in the U.S. only) is a 2014 French murder mystery film/miniseries directed by Bruno Dumont. Originally premiering as a film at the 2014 Cannes Film Festival in May (and subsequently for international releases), it was broadcast in September 2014 as a four-episode miniseries on French television.

A sequel, Coincoin and the Extra-Humans (Coincoin et les Z’inhumains), was made by Dumont in 2018, featuring most of the cast of the original film.

Cast
 Alane Delhaye as "P'tit Quinquin"
 Lucy Caron as Eve Terrier
 Bernard Pruvost as Roger Van der Weyden
 Philippe Jore as Rudy Carpentier
 Philippe Peuvion as Quinquin's father, Mr Lebleu
 Céline Sauvage as Quinquin's mother
 Jason Cirot as Dany Lebleu
 Lisa Hartmann as Aurélie Terrier
 Julien Bodard as Kevin
 Corentin Carpentier as Jordan
 Baptiste Anquez as Mohamed Bhiri
 Pascal Fresch as Mr Campin

Most of the cast was made up of natives of the Pas-de-Calais region, where the film is set, with little to no prior acting experience.  Several of the cast members also have physical disabilities, such as Jason Cirot, who plays Quinquin's uncle Dany, or Bernard Pruvost, who has a tic disorder.  Dumont responded to criticism that he was exploiting or ridiculing such individuals: "They're acting. We spent a lot of time rehearsing, and it's actor's work."  A repeating gag where Dany spins around before falling was suggested by Cirot: "Let's put this in, it's something I love doing."  According to Dumont, Pruvost's tics were more pronounced on-screen than off, due to a combination of nervousness and the use of an earpiece through which Pruvost received his lines: "The reason he keeps moving his head is because he's listening to what I'm saying in his ear."

Accolades
The prestigious Cahiers du Cinéma featured  P'tit Quinquin on their cover of the September issue  and placed it as the best picture on the 2014 Top Ten chart. In 2019, the magazine placed the film at #3 on their Top Ten of the decade.

References

External links
 
 
 
 

2014 films
French mystery films
Films shot in France
Films set in France
Films directed by Bruno Dumont
Films set on beaches
2010s French films